This is a list of the almost 450 suburbs in the Brisbane metropolis, Queensland, Australia.

Local government areas 
The Greater Brisbane, according to the Australian Bureau of Statistics, consists of the following local government areas (LGAs), with populations in 2019:

City of Brisbane

City of Brisbane has 190 suburbs according to the Brisbane City Council. There is no formal system of regions, but Brisbane suburbs are informally grouped by Brisbane residents based on their relation to the Brisbane River and the Brisbane CBD. Generally the following rules apply, Northern Suburbs include suburbs north of the Brisbane River, Southern Suburbs include suburbs south of the Brisbane River. The exceptions are Western Suburbs, which include suburbs north and south of the Brisbane River, but also west of the Brisbane CBD, and Bayside Suburbs which include suburbs along Moreton Bay.

Inner suburbs
Bowen Hills –
Brisbane CBD –
East Brisbane –
Fortitude Valley –
Herston –
Highgate Hill –
Kangaroo Point –
Kelvin Grove –
New Farm –
Newstead –
Paddington –
Petrie Terrace –
Red Hill –
South Brisbane –
Spring Hill –
Teneriffe –
West End –
Woolloongabba–
Total: 18

Northern suburbs
Albion –
Alderley –
Ascot –
Aspley –
Bald Hills –
Banyo –
Boondall –
Bracken Ridge –
Bridgeman Downs –
Brighton –
Brisbane Airport –
Carseldine –
Chermside –
Chermside West –
Clayfield –
Deagon –
Eagle Farm –
Everton Park –
Ferny Grove –
Fitzgibbon –
Gaythorne –
Geebung –
Gordon Park –
Grange –
Hamilton –
Hendra –
Kalinga –
Kedron –
Keperra –
Lutwyche –
McDowall –
Mitchelton –
Myrtletown –
Newmarket –
Northgate –
Nudgee –
Nudgee Beach –
Nundah –
Pinkenba –
Sandgate –
Shorncliffe –
Stafford –
Stafford Heights –
Taigum –
Virginia –
Wavell Heights –
Wilston –
Windsor –
Wooloowin –
Zillmere

Total: 49

Southern suburbs
Acacia Ridge –
Algester –
Annerley –
Archerfield –
Burbank –
Calamvale –
Coopers Plains –
Darra –
Doolandella –
Drewvale –
Durack –
Dutton Park –
Eight Mile Plains –
Ellen Grove –
Fairfield –
Forest Lake –
Greenslopes –
Heathwood –
Holland Park –
Holland Park West –
Inala –
Karawatha –
Kuraby –
Larapinta –
MacGregor –
Mackenzie –
Mansfield –
Moorooka –
Mount Gravatt –
Mount Gravatt East –
Nathan –
Pallara –
Parkinson –
Richlands –
Robertson –
Rochedale –
Rocklea –
Runcorn –
Salisbury –
Seventeen Mile Rocks –
Sinnamon Park –
Stones Corner –
Stretton –
Sumner –
Sunnybank –
Sunnybank Hills –
Tarragindi –
Tennyson –
Upper Mount Gravatt –
Wacol –
Willawong –
Wishart –
Yeerongpilly –
Yeronga

Total: 54

Eastern suburbs
Balmoral –
Belmont –
Bulimba –
Camp Hill –
Cannon Hill –
Carina –
Carina Heights –
Carindale –
Chandler –
Coorparoo –
Gumdale –
Hawthorne –
Hemmant –
Lota –
Lytton –
Manly –
Manly West –
Moreton Island –
Morningside –
Murarrie –
Norman Park –
Port of Brisbane –
Ransome –
Seven Hills –
Tingalpa –
Wakerley –
Wynnum –
Wynnum West

Total: 27

Western suburbs
Anstead –
Ashgrove –
Auchenflower –
Banks Creek–
Bardon –
Bellbowrie –
Brookfield –
Chapel Hill –
Chelmer –
Chuwar –
Corinda –
England Creek–
Enoggera –
Enoggera Reservoir –
Fig Tree Pocket –
Graceville –
Indooroopilly –
Jamboree Heights –
Jindalee –
Karana Downs –
Kenmore –
Kenmore Hills –
Kholo –
Lake Manchester –
Middle Park –
Milton –
Moggill –
Mount Coot-tha –
Mount Crosby –
Mount Ommaney –
Oxley –
Pinjarra Hills –
Pullenvale –
Riverhills –
Seventeen Mile Rocks –
Sherwood –
Sinnamon Park –
St Lucia –
Taringa –
The Gap –
Toowong –
Upper Brookfield –
Upper Kedron –
Westlake

Total: 43

Moreton Bay suburbs 
Moreton Bay (islands) – Moreton Island

Total: 2

City of Ipswich

Urban Ipswich
Augustine Heights –
Barellan Point –
Basin Pocket –
Bellbird Park –
Blacksoil –
Blackstone –
Booval –
Brassall –
Brookwater –
Bundamba –
Camira –
Carole Park –
Churchill –
Chuwar –
Coalfalls –
Collingwood Park –
Dinmore –
East Ipswich –
Eastern Heights –
Ebbw Vale –
Flinders View –
Gailes –
Goodna –
Ipswich –
Karalee –
Karrabin –
Leichhardt –
Moores Pocket –
Muirlea –
New Chum –
Newtown –
North Booval –
North Ipswich –
North Tivoli –
One Mile –
Raceview –
Redbank –
Redbank Plains –
Riverview –
Sadliers Crossing –
Silkstone –
Springfield –
Springfield Central –
Springfield Lakes –
Tivoli –
West Ipswich –
Woodend –
Wulkuraka –
Yamanto

Total: 49

Rural Ipswich

Amberley –
Ashwell –
Calvert –
Deebing Heights –
Ebenezer –
Goolman –
Grandchester –
Haigslea –
Ironbark –
Jeebropilly –
Lanefield –
Marburg –
Mount Forbes –
Mount Marrow –
Mutdapilly –
Pine Mountain –
Purga –
Ripley –
Rosewood –
South Ripley –
Spring Mountain –
Swanbank –
Tallegalla –
Thagoona –
The Bluff –
Walloon –
White Rock –
Willowbank –
Woolshed

Total: 29

Logan City

Bahrs Scrub –
Bannockburn –
Beenleigh –
Belivah –
Berrinba –
Bethania –
Boronia Heights –
Browns Plains –
Buccan –
Carbrook –
Cedar Creek –
Cedar Grove –
Cedar Vale –
Chambers Flat –
Cornubia –
Crestmead –
Daisy Hill –
Eagleby –
Edens Landing –
Forestdale –
Greenbank –
Heritage Park –
Hillcrest –
Holmview –
Jimboomba –
Kagaru –
Kingston –
Logan Central –
Logan Reserve –
Logan Village –
Loganholme –
Loganlea –
Lyons –
Marsden –
Meadowbrook –
Mount Warren Park –
Mundoolun –
Munruben –
New Beith –
North Maclean –
Park Ridge South –
Park Ridge –
Priestdale –
Regents Park –
Rochedale South –
Shailer Park –
Slacks Creek –
South Maclean –
Springwood –
Stockleigh –
Tamborine –
Tanah Merah –
Underwood –
Undullah –
Veresdale Scrub –
Veresdale –
Waterford West –
Waterford –
Windaroo –
Wolffdene –
Woodhill –
Woodridge –
Yarrabilba

Total: 63

Redland City

Alexandra Hills –
Amity Point –
Birkdale –
Capalaba –
Cleveland –
Coochiemudlo Island –
Dunwich –
Karragarra Island –
Lamb Island –
Macleay Island –
Mount Cotton –
North Stradbroke Island –
Ormiston –
Point Lookout –
Redland Bay –
Russell Island –
Sheldon –
Thorneside –
Thornlands –
Victoria Point –
Wellington Point

Total: 21

Moreton Bay Region

Urban
Albany Creek –
Arana Hills –
Banksia Beach –
Beachmere –
Bellara –
Bongaree –
Bray Park –
Brendale –
Bunya –
Burpengary –
Caboolture –
Caboolture South –
Cashmere –
Clontarf –
Dakabin –
Deception Bay –
Eatons Hill –
Elimbah –
Everton Hills –
Ferny Hills –
Godwin Beach –
Griffin –
Joyner –
Kallangur –
Kippa-Ring –
Kurwongbah –
Lawnton –
Mango Hill –
Margate –
Moodlu –
Morayfield –
Murrumba Downs –
Narangba –
Newport –
Ningi –
North Lakes –
Petrie –
Redcliffe –
Rothwell –
Sandstone Point –
Scarborough –
Strathpine –
Upper Caboolture –
Warner –
Whiteside –
Woody Point –
Woorim

Total: 47

Rural
Armstrong Creek –
Bellmere –
Bellthorpe –
Booroobin –
Bracalba –
Camp Mountain –
Campbells Pocket –
Cedar Creek –
Cedarton –
Clear Mountain –
Closeburn –
Commissioners Flat –
D'Aguilar –
Dayboro –
Delaneys Creek –
Donnybrook –
Draper –
Highvale –
Jollys Lookout –
King Scrub –
Kobble Creek –
Laceys Creek –
Meldale –
Moorina –
Mount Delaney –
Mount Glorious –
Mount Mee –
Mount Nebo –
Mount Pleasant –
Mount Samson –
Neurum –
Ocean View –
Rocksberg –
Rush Creek –
Samford Valley –
Samford Village –
Samsonvale –
Stanmore –
Stony Creek –
Toorbul –
Wamuran Basin –
Wamuran –
Welsby –
White Patch –
Wights Mountain –
Woodford –
Yugar

Total: 47

Scenic Rim Region

Beaudesert area 
Beaudesert – Beechmont – Benobble – Biddaddaba – Birnam – Boyland – Bromelton – Canungra – Christmas Creek – Cryna – Gleneagle – Hillview – Innisplain – Josephville – Kerry – Kooralbyn – Lamington – Lamington National Park – Laravale – Palen Creek – Rathdowney – Tabooba – Tabragalba – Tamborine Mountain – Tamrookum – Tamrookum Creek – Witheren – Wonglepong

Boonah area 
Aratula – Boonah – Charlwood – Coulson – Fassifern – Harrisville – Kalbar – Maroon – Moogerah – Mount Alford – Mount Walker – Roadvale – Rosevale – Silverdale – Tarome – Templin – Warrill View

Other areas 
Allandale – Allenview – Anthony – Barney View – Binna Burra – Blantyre – Bunburra – Bunjurgen – Burnett Creek – Cainbable – Cannon Creek – Carneys Creek – Chinghee Creek – Clumber – Coleyville – Coochin – Croftby – Darlington – Dugandan – Fassifern Valley – Ferny Glen – Flying Fox – Frazerview – Frenches Creek – Hoya – Illinbah – Kagaru – Kents Lagoon – Kents Pocket – Knapp Creek – Kulgun – Limestone Ridges – Lower Mount Walker – Merryvale – Milbong – Milford – Milora – Moorang – Morwincha – Mount Barney – Mount Edwards – Mount Forbes – Mount French – Mount Gipps – Mount Lindesay – Mount Walker West – Munbilla – Mutdapilly – Nindooinbah – North Tamborine – Oaky Creek – Obum Obum – O'Reilly – Peak Crossing – Radford – Running Creek – Sarabah – Southern Lamington – Tamborine – Teviotville – Undullah – Veresdale – Veresdale Scrub – Wallaces Creek – Washpool – Wilsons Plains – Woolooman – Wyaralong

Somerset Region

Kilcoy area 
Glenfern – Hazeldean – Jimna – Kilcoy – Monsildale – Villeneuve – Winya

Esk area 
Borallon – Caboonbah – Clarendon – Colinton – Coolana – Coominya – Dundas – Esk – Fairney View – Fernvale – Glamorgan Vale – Harlin – Lake Somerset – Lake Wivenhoe – Lark Hill – Linville – Lowood – Minden – Moore – Mount Hallen – Mount Tarampa – Prenzlau – Rifle Range – Tarampa – Toogoolawah – Vernor – Wanora

Other areas  
Atkinsons Dam – Avoca Vale – Banks Creek – Biarra – Braemore – Brightview – Bryden – Buaraba – Coal Creek – Cooeeimbardi – Cressbrook – Crossdale – England Creek – Eskdale – Fulham – Glen Esk – Gregors Creek – Haigslea – Ivory Creek – Kingaham – Lake Manchester – Lockrose – Lower Cressbrook – Marburg – Moombra – Mount Archer – Mount Beppo – Mount Byron – Mount Kilcoy – Mount Stanley – Murrumba – Ottaba – Patrick Estate – Redbank Creek – Royston – Sandy Creek – Scrub Creek – Sheep Station Creek – Somerset Dam – Split Yard Creek – Westvale – Wivenhoe Hill – Wivenhoe Pocket – Woolmar – Yimbun

Lockyer Valley Region

Gatton area 
Adare – Blanchview – College View – Fordsdale – Gatton – Grantham – Helidon – Iredale – Junction View – Lake Clarendon – Lawes – Lower Tenthill – Ma Ma Creek – Murphys Creek – Placid Hills – Ropeley – Thornton – Upper Tenthill – Veradilla – Winwill – Withcott – Woodlands

Laidley area 
Blenheim – Forest Hill – Glenore Grove – Hatton Vale – Kentville – Laidley – Laidley Heights – Lockrose – Mulgowie – Plainland – Regency Downs

Other areas 
Ballard – Black Duck Creek – Brightview – Buaraba South – Caffey – Carpendale – Churchable – Crowley Vale – Derrymore – East Haldon – Egypt – Fifteen Mile – Flagstone Creek – Glen Cairn – Helidon Spa – Ingoldsby – Kensington Grove – Laidley Creek West – Laidley North – Laidley South – Lefthand Branch – Lilydale – Lockyer – Lockyer Waters – Lynford – Morton Vale – Mount Berryman – Mount Sylvia – Mount Whitestone – Postmans Ridge – Preston – Ringwood – Rockmount – Rockside – Seventeen Mile – Silver Ridge – Spring Creek – Stockyard – Summerholm – Townson – Upper Flagstone – Upper Lockyer – Vinegar Hill – West Haldon – White Mountain – Woodbine

See also
Brisbane suburbs with Aboriginal names

References

External links

 
Brisbane
Suburbs